The Sunken World is a  science fiction novel by American writer Stanton A. Coblentz.  It was first published in book form in 1948 by Fantasy Publishing Company, Inc. in an edition of 1,000 copies.  The novel originally appeared in the Summer 1928 issue of the magazine Amazing Stories Quarterly.  It was Coblentz's first published science fiction novel.

Plot introduction
The novel concerns Anton Harkness, the commander of an American submarine in World War I which is caught in a whirlpool which drags it to the bottom of the sea where it collides with a glass dome.  The crew are rescued by the Atlanteans who live beneath the dome.  Harkness falls in love with an Atlantean girl with whom he escapes after the Atlantean dome is destroyed.

Sources

External links 
 

1928 American novels
1928 science fiction novels
American science fiction novels
Atlantis in fiction
Works originally published in Amazing Stories
Works by Stanton A. Coblentz
Fantasy Publishing Company, Inc. books